Jeffrey Bryan Wall (born 25 April 1976) is an American attorney and former government official who served as the acting Solicitor General of the United States and the Principal Deputy Solicitor General of the United States during the Donald Trump administration.  He is now a partner and head of Supreme Court and Appellate Practice at Sullivan & Cromwell in New York and Washington, DC.

Early life and education 
Wall was born in Roswell, Georgia. He earned a Bachelor of Arts degree from Georgetown University, where he was a member of the Philodemic Society, and Juris Doctor from the University of Chicago Law School.

Career 
Wall taught Civics at Orchard Lake St. Mary's Preparatory in Orchard Lake, Michigan, where he also coached Lacrosse.

 Wall clerked for Judge J. Harvie Wilkinson of the Fourth Circuit Court of Appeals during the 2003–2004 term and U.S. Supreme Court Justice Clarence Thomas during the 2004–2005 term and has argued thirty cases before the Supreme Court of the United States.

After his first stint at the US Solicitor General's office, Wall served as co-head of Appellate Litigation Practice at Sullivan & Cromwell LLP.  While there, Wall was named a "rising star" by Law360 for his performances in arguing before the Supreme Court, including a case addressing the standard for awarding enhanced damages in patent cases.

Wall returned to the Office of the Solicitor General in March 2017 as the Acting Solicitor General.  After Solicitor General Noel Francisco was confirmed in September 2017, Wall served as the Principal Deputy. Wall argued on behalf of the United States in Hawaii v. Trump in front of the United States Court of Appeals for the Ninth Circuit in the William Kenzo Nakamura United States Courthouse in Seattle, Washington. On November 30, 2020, Wall argued the case Trump v. New York addressing President Trump's plan for the census on behalf of the United States government.  Upon the resignation of Noel Francisco, Wall was selected to serve as the acting Solicitor General of the United States.

Wall left the Office of the Solicitor General in January 2021 and returned Sullivan & Cromwell LLP where he is a partner and head of Supreme Court and Appellate Practice.

See also 
 List of law clerks of the Supreme Court of the United States (Seat 10)

References

External links

Appearances at U.S. Supreme Court, Oyez.org.

1976 births
American lawyers
Georgetown University alumni
Philodemic Society members
People associated with Kirkland & Ellis
Law clerks of the Supreme Court of the United States
Living people
Sullivan & Cromwell people
Trump administration personnel
United States Department of Justice lawyers
United States Solicitors General
University of Chicago Law School alumni